A disk image is a snapshot of a storage device's structure and data typically stored in one or more computer files on another storage device. Traditionally, disk images were bit-by-bit copies of every sector on a hard disk often created for digital forensic purposes, but it is now common to only copy allocated data to reduce storage space. Compression and deduplication are commonly used to reduce the size of the image file set. Disk imaging is done for a variety of purposes including digital forensics, cloud computing, system administration, as part of a backup strategy, and legacy emulation as part of a digital preservation strategy. Disk images can be made in a variety of formats depending on the purpose. Virtual disk images (such as VHD and VMDK) are intended to be used for cloud computing, ISO images are intended to emulate optical media and RAW disk images are used for forensic purposes. Proprietary formats are typically used by disk imaging software. Despite the benefits of disk imaging the storage costs can be high, management can be difficult and they can be time consuming to create.

Background

Disk images were originally (in the late 1960s) used for backup and disk cloning of mainframe disk media. The early ones were as small as 5 megabytes and as large as 330 megabytes, and the copy medium was magnetic tape, which ran as large as 200 megabytes per reel. Disk images became much more popular when floppy disk media became popular, where replication or storage of an exact structure was necessary and efficient, especially in the case of copy protected floppy disks.

Disk image creation is called disk imaging and is often time consuming, even with a fast computer, because the entire disk must be copied. Typically, disk imaging requires a third party disk imaging program or backup software. The software required varies according to the type of disk image that needs to be created. For example, RawWrite and WinImage create floppy disk image files for MS-DOS and Microsoft Windows. In Unix or similar systems the dd program can be used to create raw disk images. Apple Disk Copy can be used on Classic Mac OS and macOS systems to create and write disk image files.

Authoring software for CDs/DVDs such as Nero Burning ROM can generate and load disk images for optical media. A virtual disk writer or virtual burner is a computer program that emulates an actual disc authoring device such as a CD writer or DVD writer. Instead of writing data to an actual disc, it creates a virtual disk image. A virtual burner, by definition, appears as a disc drive in the system with writing capabilities (as opposed to conventional disc authoring programs that can create virtual disk images), thus allowing software that can burn discs to create virtual discs.

Uses

Digital forensics
Forensic imaging is the process of creating a bit-by-bit copy of the data on the drive, including files, metadata, volume information, filesystems and their structure. Often, these images are also hashed to verify their integrity and that they have not been altered since being created. Unlike disk imaging for other purposes, digital forensic applications take a bit-by-bit copy to ensure forensic soundness. The purposes of imaging the disk is to not only discover evidence preserved in digital information but also to examine the drive to gather clues of how the crime was committed.

Cloud computing
In cloud computing, creating a disk image of optical media or a hard disk drive is typically done to make the content available to one or more virtual machines. Virtual machines emulate a CD/DVD drive by reading an ISO image. This can also be faster than reading from the physical optical medium. Further, there are less issues with wear and tear. A hard disk drive or solid-state drive in a virtual machine is implemented as a disk image (i.e. either the VHD format used by Microsoft's Hyper-V, the VDI format used by Oracle Corporation's VirtualBox, the VMDK format used for VMware virtual machines, or the QCOW format used by QEMU). Virtual hard disk images tend to be stored as either a collection of files (where each one is typically 2GB in size), or as a single file. Virtual machines treat the image set as a physical drive.

System administration

Rapid deployment of clone systems 
Educational institutions and businesses can often need to buy or replace computer systems in large numbers. Disk imaging is commonly used to deploy the same configuration across workstations. Typically, disk imaging software (such as Ghost or Clonezilla) is used to make an image of a completely configured system. This image is then written to a computer's hard disk which is sometimes described as restoring an image. This restoration is sometimes done over a computer network using multicasting or BitTorrent to devices that need to have their configuration restored. This reduces the need to maintain and update individual systems manually. Imaging is also easier than automated setup methods because an administrator does not need to have knowledge of the prior configuration to copy it. Disk imaging requires for all devices to be identical and provides no flexibility in adjusting the configuration.

Network-based image deployment typically uses a PXE server to boot a minimal operating system over the network that contains the necessary components to image or restore storage media in a computer. This is usually used in conjunction with a DHCP server to automate the configuration of network parameters including IP addresses. Typically, multicasting, broadcasting or unicasting is used to restore an image to many computers at a time but these approaches do not work well if one or more computers experience a problem such as UDP packet loss. As a result, some imaging solutions instead use the BitTorrent protocol to transfer the data.

Backup strategy

A disk image contains all files, faithfully replicating all data, including file attributes and the file fragmentation state. For this reason, it is also used for backing up optical media (CDs and DVDs, etc.), and allows the exact and efficient recovery after experimenting with modifications to a system or virtual machine. Typically, disk imaging can be used to quickly restore an entire system to an operational state after a disaster.

Digital preservation
Libraries and museums are typically required to archive and digitally preserve information without altering it in any manner. Emulators frequently use disk images to emulate floppy disks that have been preserved. This is usually simpler to program than accessing a real floppy drive (particularly if the disks are in a format not supported by the host operating system), and allows a large library of software to be managed. Emulation also allows existing disk images to be put into a usable form even though the data contained in the image is no longer readable without emulation.

Limitations 
Disk images can sometimes be slower than reading from the disk directly because of a performance overhead. Other limitations can be the lack of access to software required to read the contents of the image. For example, prior to Windows 8, third party software was required to mount disk images. Disk imaging is time consuming and the space requirements are high. When imaging multiple computers with only minor differences, much data is duplicated unnecessarily, wasting space.

Speed and failure 
Disk imaging can be slow, especially for older storage devices. A typical 4.7 GB DVD can take an average of 18 minutes to duplicate. Floppy disks read and write much slower than hard disks. Therefore, despite their small size, it can take several minutes to copy a single disk. In some cases, disk imaging can fail due to bad sectors or physical wear and tear on the source device. Utilities such as dd are not designed to recognize or cope with failures. Therefore, any failure results in being unable to create an image of the drive.

See also
Boot image
Card image
Comparison of disc image software
Disk cloning
El Torito (CD-ROM standard)
ISO image, an archive file of an optical media volume
Loop device
Mtools
no-CD crack
Protected Area Run Time Interface Extension Services (PARTIES)
ROM image
Software cracking

References

External links
Software repository including RAWRITE2

 
Archive formats
Compact Disc and DVD copy protection
Computer file formats
Disk image emulators
Hacker culture
Hardware virtualization
Optical disc authoring
Warez